Cacyreus lingeus, the common bush blue or bush bronze, is a butterfly of the family Lycaenidae. As with other Cacyreus species it is endemic to the Afrotropics.

Range
It is a common species in much of sub-Saharan Africa, though mostly at lower altitudes.

Description
The wingspan is 22–27 mm for males and 22–28 mm for females. The larvae are pale green.

Habits
Adults are on wing year-round, with a peak from October to February. In exceptional situations adults may be on the wing in winter months in cooler areas.

Foodplants
The larvae may feed on the flowers, the leaves or inside the stems of their foodplants. Various Lamiaceae species are utilized, including Plectranthus, Salvia, Calamintha, Lavandula, Mentha and Hemizygia species.

Gallery

References

Butterflies described in 1782
Cacyreus
Fauna of Rivers State